Sergei Seregeyevich Yemelin (born May 1, 1991) is a Russian professional ice hockey player. He is currently under contract with Toros Neftekamsk of the Supreme Hockey League (VHL).

Yemelin made his Kontinental Hockey League (KHL) debut playing with Salavat Yulaev Ufa during the 2011–12 KHL season.

References

External links

1991 births
Living people
Avtomobilist Yekaterinburg players
Metallurg Novokuznetsk players
Russian ice hockey forwards
Salavat Yulaev Ufa players
Toros Neftekamsk players
Sportspeople from Ufa